Route 360 is a collector road in the Canadian province of Nova Scotia.

It is located in Kings County and connects Berwick at Trunk 1 with Harbourville.

It climbs the steep southern slope of the North Mountain in a sharp hairpin turn known locally as "The Oxbow".

Communities
Morristown
Berwick
Somerset
Welsford
Garland
Harbourville

See also
List of Nova Scotia provincial highways

References

Nova Scotia provincial highways
Roads in Kings County, Nova Scotia